Buddhist cuisine is an Asian cuisine that is followed by monks and many believers from areas historically influenced by Mahayana Buddhism. It is vegetarian or vegan, and it is based on the Dharmic concept of ahimsa (non-violence). Vegetarianism is common in other Dharmic faiths such as Hinduism, Jainism and Sikhism, as well as East Asian religions like Taoism. While monks, nuns and a minority of believers are vegetarian year-round, many believers follow the Buddhist vegetarian diet for celebrations.

The origin of "Buddhist food" as a distinct sub-style of cuisine is tied to monasteries, where one member of the community would have the duty of being the head cook and supplying meals that paid respect to the strictures of Buddhist precepts. Temples that were open to visitors from the general public might also serve meals to them and a few temples effectively run functioning restaurants on the premises. In modern times, commercial restaurants have also latched on to the style, catering both to practicing and non-practicing lay people.

Philosophies governing food

Vegetarianism 

Most of the dishes considered to be uniquely Buddhist are vegetarian, but not all Buddhist traditions require vegetarianism of lay followers or clergy. Vegetarian eating is primarily associated with the East and Southeast Asian tradition in China, Vietnam, Japan, and Korea where it is commonly practiced by clergy and may be observed by laity on holidays or as a devotional practice.

In the Mahayana tradition, several sutras of the Mahayana canon contain explicit prohibitions against consuming meat, including sections of the Lankavatara Sutra and Surangama Sutra. The monastic community in Chinese Buddhism, Vietnamese Buddhism and most of Korean Buddhism strictly adhere to vegetarianism. 

Theravada Buddhist monks and nuns consume food by gathering alms themselves, and generally must eat whatever foods are offered to them, including meat. The exception to this alms rule is when monks and nuns have seen, heard or known that animal(s) have been specifically killed to feed the alms-seeker, in which case consumption of such meat would be karmically negative, as well as meat from certain animals, such as dogs and snakes, that were regarded as impure in ancient India. The same restriction is also followed by some lay Buddhists and is known as the consumption of "triply clean meat" (三净肉). The Pāli Scriptures also indicated that Lord Buddha refusing a proposal by his traitor disciple Devadatta to mandate vegetarianism in the monastic precepts.

Tibetan Buddhism has long accepted that the practical difficulties in obtaining vegetables and grains within most of Tibet make it impossible to insist upon vegetarianism; however, many leading Tibetan Buddhist teachers agree upon the great worth of practicing vegetarianism whenever and wherever possible, such as Chatral Rinpoche, a lifelong advocate of vegetarianism who famously released large amounts of fish caught for food back into the ocean once a year, and who wrote about the practice of saving lives.

Both Mahayana and Theravada Buddhists consider that one may practice vegetarianism as part of cultivating Bodhisattvas's paramita.

Other restrictions 

In addition to the ban on garlic, practically all Mahayana monastics in China, Korea, Vietnam and Japan specifically avoid eating strong-smelling plants, traditionally asafoetida, shallot, mountain leek and Allium chinense, which together with garlic are referred to as wǔ hūn (五葷, or 'Five Acrid and Strong-smelling Vegetables') or wǔ xīn (五辛 or 'Five Spices') as they tend to excite senses. This is based on teachings found in the Brahamajala Sutra, the Surangama Sutra and the Lankavatara Sutra (chapter eight). In modern times this rule is often interpreted to include other vegetables of the onion genus, as well as coriander. The origin of this additional restriction is from the Indic region and can still be found among some believers of Hinduism and Jainism. Some Taoists also have this additional restriction but the list of restricted plants differs from the Buddhist list.

The food that a strict Buddhist takes, if not a vegetarian, is also specific. For many Chinese Buddhists, beef and the consumption of large animals and exotic species is avoided. Then there would be the aforementioned "triply clean meat" rule. One restriction on food that is not known to many is the abstinence from eating animal offal (organ meat). This is known as xiàshui (下水), not to be confused with the term for sewage.

Alcohol and other drugs are also avoided by many Buddhists because of their effects on the mind and "mindfulness". It is part of the Five Precepts which dictate that one is not to consume "addictive materials". The definition of "addictive" depends on each individual but most Buddhists consider alcohol, tobacco and drugs other than medicine to be addictive. Although caffeine is now also known to be addictive, caffeinated drinks and especially tea are not included under this restriction; tea in particular is considered to be healthful and beneficial and its mild stimulant effect desirable. There are many legends about tea.  Among meditators it is considered to keep the person alert and awake without overexcitement.

Simple and natural 

In theory and practice, many regional styles of cooking may be adapted to be "Buddhist" as long as the cook, with the above restrictions in mind, prepares the food, generally in simple preparations, with expert attention to its quality, wholesomeness and flavor. Often working on a tight budget, the monastery cook would have to make the most of whatever ingredients were available.

In Tenzo kyokun ("Instructions for the Zen Cook"), Soto Zen founder Eihei Dogen wrote the following about the Zen attitude toward food:

In preparing food, it is essential to be sincere and to respect each ingredient regardless of how coarse or fine it is. (...) A rich buttery soup is not better as such than a broth of wild herbs. In handling and preparing wild herbs, do so as you would the ingredients for a rich feast, wholeheartedly, sincerely, clearly. When you serve the monastic assembly, they and you should taste only the flavour of the Ocean of Reality, the Ocean of unobscured Awake Awareness, not whether or not the soup is creamy or made only of wild herbs. In nourishing the seeds of living in the Way, rich food and wild grass are not separate.

Ingredients 

Following its dominant status in most parts of East Asia where Buddhism is most practiced, rice features heavily as a staple in the Buddhist meal, especially in the form of rice porridge or congee as the usual morning meal. Noodles and other grains may often be served as well.  Vegetables of all sorts are generally either stir-fried or cooked in vegetarian broth with seasonings and may be eaten with various sauces. Traditionally eggs and dairy are not permitted. Seasonings will be informed by whatever is common in the local region; for example, soy sauce and vegan dashi figure strongly in Japanese monastery food while curry and Tương (as a vegetarian replacement for fish sauce) may be prominent in Southeast Asia. Sweets and desserts are not often consumed, but are permitted in moderation and may be served at special occasions such as in the context of a tea ceremony in the Zen tradition.

Buddhist vegetarian chefs have become extremely creative in imitating meat using prepared wheat gluten, also known as seitan, kao fu (烤麸) or wheat meat, soy (such as tofu or tempeh), agar, konnyaku and other plant products.  Some of their recipes are the oldest and most-refined meat analogues in the world.  Soy and wheat gluten are very versatile materials, because they can be manufactured into various shapes and textures, and they absorb flavorings (including, but not limited to, meat-like flavorings), while having very little flavor of their own.  With the proper seasonings, they can mimic various kinds of meat quite closely.

Some of these Buddhist vegetarian chefs are in the many monasteries and temples which serve allium-free and mock-meat (also known as 'meat analogues') dishes to the monks and visitors (including non-Buddhists who often stay for a few hours or days, to Buddhists who are not monks, but staying overnight for anywhere up to weeks or months). Many Buddhist restaurants also serve vegetarian, vegan, non-alcoholic or allium-free dishes.

Some Buddhists eat vegetarian on the 1st and 15th of the lunar calendar (lenten days), on Chinese New Year eve, and on saint and ancestral holy days.  To cater to this type of customer, as well as full-time vegetarians, the menu of a Buddhist vegetarian restaurant usually shows no difference from a typical Chinese or East Asian restaurant, except that in recipes originally made to contain meat, a soy chicken substitute might be served instead.

Variations by sect or region 

According to cookbooks published in English, formal monastery meals in the Zen tradition generally follow a pattern of "three bowls" in descending size. The first and largest bowl is a grain-based dish such as rice, noodles or congee; the second contains the protein dish which is often some form of stew or soup; the third and smallest bowl is a vegetable dish or a salad.

See also 

 Buddha's delight

 Buddhist ethics
 Buddhist vegetarianism
 Cultural elements of Buddhism
 Index of Buddhism-related articles
 List of diets
 Secular Buddhism
 Vegetarian cuisine
 Vegetarianism and religion
 Korean temple cuisine
 Kaiseki

References

External links 

 Shabkar.org: Vegetarianism as a way of life for Buddhists
 Shojin Ryori: Vegetarian Cooking
 Tantras on Buddhist food
 Sutras on vegetarianism
 Return To The Middle Kingdom: Chinese Vegetarian Eating in East Asia
 Toshio Tanahashi
 vegetarian-china.info

 
Food and drink in Buddhism
Buddhism in China
Buddhist